State Route 151 (SR 151) is a  L-shaped state highway in the U.S. state of Maine. Running entirely in Somerset County, it travels from U.S. Route 2 (US 2) in Palmyra to Northeast Somerset, an unorganized territory within the state. It passes through the towns of Hartland, Athens, and Brighton intersecting other state highways in the centers of these towns.

Route description
SR 151 begins near the town center of Palmyra at US 2 (Main Street) at a stop-controlled intersection. It first heads north-northwest along Warren Hill Road through a mostly rural area passing to the west of Whites Pond. At an intersection surrounded by three houses, SR 151 turns west and turns towards the north at a small farm. It makes one more 90-degree curve to the west through wooded areas before gently curving towards the northwest into the limits of Hartland. After passing a few small businesses and a school (at this point carrying the name Elm Street), SR 151 reaches an intersection with Main Street, Academy Street, and Commercial Street. State Routes 23, 43, and 152 follow Main Street and Academny Street east-west through this intersection; SR 151 joins the concurrency of these routes by heading west along Main Street past a small factory, over the Sebasticook River, and by additional businesses. SR 152 breaks off from the concurrency at Pittsfield Avenue, SR 23 breaks off immediately afterwards at Lower Main Street while SR 43 and SR 151 bear to the northwest along Pleasant Street.

After a short distance of houses lining the street, SR 43 and SR 151 briefly parallel the Sebasticook River before transitioning to a more rural setting zig-zagging west. The road passes to the south of Great Moose Lake before crossing into the town of Athens briefly. It then heads through the northeast corner of Cornville before reentering Athens. At a wye intersection near the town center of Athens, SR 43 ends its concurrency with SR 151 while SR 150, which entered from the southwest, joins a new concurrency past small businesses in Athens. SR 151 heads north through rolling hills and forestland.  past Athens, the road reaches a small clearing which is the center of the town of Brighton. At the center, SR 154 has its western terminus at SR 151. SR 151 contunes north before ending at an intersection with SR 16 in the Northeast Somerset hamlet of Mayfield Corner, northwest of two small ponds.

Major junctions

References

External links

Floodgap Roadgap's RoadsAroundME: Maine State Route 151

151
Transportation in Somerset County, Maine